Rhododendron oreodoxa is a species of flowering plant in the genus Rhododendron native to central China. Its variety Rhododendron oreodoxa var. fargesii, called the Père Farges rhododendron, has gained the Royal Horticultural Society's Award of Garden Merit.

Varieties
The following varieties are currently accepted:
Rhododendron oreodoxa var. adenostylosum W.P.Fang & W.K.Hu
Rhododendron oreodoxa var. fargesii (Franch.) D.F.Chamb.
Rhododendron oreodoxa var. shensiense D.F.Chamb.

References

oreodoxa
Endemic flora of China
Plants described in 1886